Dr. Dre Presents... The Aftermath is a compilation album by American and West Coast rapper Dr. Dre. It was released on November 26, 1996, as the first album on Aftermath Entertainment. Dre's scarce vocals, newly critiquing gangsta rap, marked Dre's reemergence after his March 1996 departure from Death Row Records, where Dre himself had propelled gangsta rap into the mainstream. (Dre had co-founded Death Row Records in 1991 amid his embattled split from Ruthless Records and its pioneering, gangsta rap group N.W.A.)

The 1996 album's first single, a Dre solo, is the only track with Dre as main vocalist, "Been There, Done That." The second single was "East Coast/West Coast Killas", prominent rappers from California, New York, and Texas rebuking rap's recently ugly East–West "war." A platinum seller, the album peaked at #6 on the Billboard 200 and at #3 on the Top R&B/Hip Hop-Albums charts. Nonetheless, quite unlike Dre's prior album—The Chronic, released in December 1992 as Dre's debut solo album and Death Row Records' first album—Dre's new offering, not a standout, received mixed reviews and lukewarm appraisals.

The Glove, among the album's coproducers, reasoned, "People were upset because they wanted a 'Dr. Dre' album. They weren't looking for a compilation album. That's what messed that up. Plus the single 'Been There, Done That' was cool, but it was taking away from the gangster style that people wanted." Himself commenting on the album, Dre remarked, "It was just okay. That was a hit and miss." More broadly, Dre explained, "That point of my life, musically, it was just off balance. I was off track then and trying to find it. It was a period of doubt. . . It happens with artists. Everything isn't going to be out of the park."

Track listing

Charts

Weekly charts

Year-end charts

Singles

Certifications

References

1996 compilation albums
Albums produced by Bud'da
Albums produced by Dr. Dre
Hip hop compilation albums
Aftermath Entertainment compilation albums
Interscope Records compilation albums
Compilation albums by American artists
Record label compilation albums